Mufti Muhammad Sadiq (January 11, 1872 – January 13, 1957) was a companion of Mirza Ghulam Ahmad and a Muslim missionary in the United States. Sadiq converted over seven hundred Americans to Islam directly, and over one thousand indirectly. His purpose, as a representative of the Ahmadiyya Movement in Islam, was to convert Americans to Islam and to clear general misconceptions about the religion. Something that separated Mutfi Muhammad Sadiq from his contemporaries was his belief in racial integration between all racial and ethnic groups, and not just African Americans. He was also important in the movement of trying to unite a multicultural group of Muslim immigrants, from Arabs to Bosnians, to build mosques and have congregational prayers, especially in Detroit and Chicago.

Sadiq entered the US without any financial resources, and embarked upon spreading the message of Islam in an area that was completely alien to his native culture. Consequently, he faced many difficulties, trials, and tribulations due to his skin color and religion. Sadiq also managed to establish the Moslem Sunrise, the longest running Muslim publication in America, as well as writing many articles on Islam in various American periodicals and newspapers.

References

Bibliography

 
 

1872 births
Year of death missing
Punjabi people
Muslim missionaries
People from Rabwah
Pakistani Ahmadis